Prince Xian of the First Rank, or simply Prince Xian, was the title of a princely peerage used in China during the Manchu-led Qing dynasty (1636–1912). As the Prince Xian peerage was not awarded "iron-cap" status, this meant that each successive bearer of the title would normally start off with a title downgraded by one rank vis-à-vis that held by his predecessor. However, the title would generally not be downgraded to any lower than a feng'en fuguo gong except under special circumstances.

The first bearer of the title was Yunbi (允祕; 1716–1773), the 24th son of the Kangxi Emperor. In 1733, he was awarded the title "Prince Xian of the First Rank" by his fourth brother, the Yongzheng Emperor, who succeeded their father. The title was passed down over seven generations and was held by six persons.

Members of the Prince Xian peerage
 Yunbi (允祕; 1716–1773), the Kangxi Emperor's 24th son, held the title Prince Xian of the First Rank from 1733 to 1773, posthumously honoured as Prince Xianke of the First Rank (諴恪親王)
Hongchang (弘暢; 1741–1795), Yunbi's eldest son, initially a buru bafen zhenguo gong from 1757 to 1774, held the title Prince Xian of the Second Rank from 1774 to 1795, posthumously honoured as Prince Xianmi of the Second Rank (諴密郡王)
 Yongzhu (永珠; 1759–1837), Hongchang's eldest son, initially a third class zhenguo jiangjun from 1784 to 1788, held the title of a beile from 1795 to 1836, stripped of his title in 1836
 Hongwu (弘旿; 1743–1811), Yunbi's second son, held the title of a second class zhenguo jiangjun from 1753 to 1774, promoted to beizi in 1774, stripped of his title in 1778, reinstated as a feng'en jiangjun in 1794, stripped of his title in 1799 but restored in 1809
Yongsong (永松; 1782–1827), Hongwu's fifth son, held the title of a feng'en jiangjun from 1811 to 1827, posthumously honoured as a beizi in 1837
 Mianxun (綿勳; 1817–1893), Yongsong's second son, held the title of a feng'en jiangjun from 1827 to 1836, promoted to beizi in 1836
 Yijun (奕均; 1836–1871), Mianxun's second son, held the title of a zhenguo jiangjun from 1868 to 1871
 Zaixin (載信; 1855–1900), Yijun's eldest son, held the title of a zhenguo jiangjun from 1872 to 1894, promoted to feng'en zhenguo gong in 1894
 Puyu (溥霱; 1879–1934), Zaixin's eldest son, held the title of a feng'en zhenguo gong from 1902 to 1934
 Puji (溥霽), Zaixin's second son, held the title of a first class fuguo jiangjun from 1904 to 1933
 Pubin (溥霦), Zaixin's third son, held the title of a first class fuguo jiangjun from 1904
 Pumu (溥霂), Zaixin's fourth son, held the title of a first class fuguo jiangjun from 1904
 Yongxiang (永祥), Hongchang's second son, held the title of a third class zhenguo jiangjun from 1784 to 1811
 Mianjie (綿傑), Yongxiang's eldest son, held the title of a fuguo jiangjun from 1826 to 1829, had no male heir
 Yongqin (永芩), Hongchang's third son, held the title of a third class zhenguo jiangjun from 1791 to 1826, stripped of his title in 1826
 Mianhuan (綿煥), Yongqin's eldest son, held the title of a feng'en jiangjun from 1826 to 1852, had no male heir
 Mianxing (綿𠻖), Yongqin's third son, initially held the title of a fuguo jiangjun, demoted to feng'en jiangjun in 1825, succeeded Yongyu in 1840
 Yongyu (永裕), Hongchang's fourth son, held the title of a third class zhenguo jiangjun from 1791 to 1825
 Miandan (綿丹), Yongyu's eldest son, held the title of a fuguo jiangjun from 1825 to 1845, had no male heir
 Hongkang (弘康; 1747–1814), Yunbi's third son, initially a second class zhenguo jiangjun from 1770 to 1809, became an acting buru bafen fuguo gong from 1809 to 1814
 Yongchun (永純), Hongkang's eldest son, held the title of a fengguo jiangjun from 1811 to 1814, became a fuguo jiangjun from 1814 to 1841, stripped of his title in 1841
 Hongchao (弘超; 1755–1808), Yunbi's fourth son, held the title of a third class fuguo jiangjun from 1775 to 1777, stripped of his title in 1777

Family tree

See also
 Royal and noble ranks of the Qing dynasty

References
 

Qing dynasty princely peerages